Julius L. Chambers High School, is a high school located in Charlotte, North Carolina, United States. It is part of the Charlotte-Mecklenburg School System, and opened in 1997.  The sports teams are known as the Cougars.  

Besides providing the standard state-mandated high school curriculum, the school also has an engineering academy, which gives advanced training to students interested in engineering careers.

Name change
The school was originally named after Zebulon Baird Vance, a Confederate military officer in the American Civil War, slave owner, twice Governor of North Carolina, and U.S. Senator. In June 2020, as a result of the George Floyd protests, the Charlotte-Mecklenburg School Board officially stated that they had started the process to rename the school to remove the association with the Confederacy. 

In October 2020, the Charlotte-Mecklenburg School board decided to name the school after Julius L. Chambers, who was a famous lawyer, civil rights leader, and educator from North Carolina. The school officially changed its name in a ceremony July 14, 2021.

Athletics
Chambers High School is a part of the North Carolina High School Athletic Association (NCHSAA) and are classified as a 4A school. Their team name is the "Cougars." The school colors are navy blue and orange.

On May 8, 2021, the school won its second straight North Carolina 4AA state championship in football, in its third straight appearance in the championship game.

Notable alumni
 DaBaby, rapper
 Myles Dorn, professional football player
 E. J. Drayton, former professional basketball player
 Chavis Holmes, professional basketball player
 Travis Holmes, former professional basketball player
 Paul Troth, football coach

References

External links 
 

Public high schools in North Carolina
Educational institutions established in 1997
Schools in Charlotte, North Carolina
1997 establishments in North Carolina
Name changes due to the George Floyd protests